The fifth season of the American television musical drama series Nashville, created by Callie Khouri, it premiered on December 15, 2016, on CMT, the first on the network. The show features an ensemble cast with Connie Britton and Hayden Panettiere in the leading roles as two country music superstars, Rayna Jaymes and Juliette Barnes. The season consisted of 22 episodes that were aired in two parts of eleven episodes each, with Britton appearing in the first part only.

As with seasons three and four, the episodes are named after songs from a variety of country artists, including Sara Evans ("A Little Bit Stronger"), Garth Brooks ("If Tomorrow Never Comes"), Carrie Underwood ("The Night Before (Life Goes On)"), Sheryl Crow ("A Change Would Do You Good"), and Dixie Chicks ("Not Ready to Make Nice").

Production
On May 12, 2016, ABC cancelled the series after four seasons. On June 10, 2016, it was announced that CMT had picked up the series for a fifth season of 22 episodes. The pick-up was assisted by $11 million in economic incentives: $8.5 million comes via the State of Tennessee Film Office, $1 million from the City of Nashville, $1 million from the Nashville Convention & Visitor Corp and $500,000 from Ryman Hospitality. The cast had the first table read on September 1, 2016. Filming began on September 7, 2016. Lily Mariye directed the fourth episode, which began filming on October 10, 2016. Production was well underway by November 2016, with filming on the sixth episode beginning on Friday, November 4. On March 16, 2017, the cast celebrated completing filming on the 100th episode. Filming on the seventeenth episode was taking place on April 26, 2017. Sam Palladio filmed his final scenes for the season on Tuesday, May 30, 2017. The season wrap party was held on June 4, 2017. Filming wrapped on June 8, 2017.

On December 1, 2016, it was announced that the first hour of the two-hour season premiere would premiere December 15, 2016. The sneak peek airing of the first episode aired simultaneously on CMT, MTV, and TV Land. The double episode season premiere totaled a 0.8 demo as it aired across two networks, CMT and Nick at Night. New episodes first air on CMT, and then air again on Nick at Night, the same day.

Cast

The fifth season featured two main cast members see their exit. Will Chase and Aubrey Peeples were announced to not be returning to the series in June 2016, although Chase did make a guest appearance.

Main
 Connie Britton as Rayna Jaymes 
 Hayden Panettiere as Juliette Barnes
 Clare Bowen as Scarlett O'Connor
 Chris Carmack as Will Lexington
 Charles Esten as Deacon Claybourne
 Jonathan Jackson as Avery Barkley
 Sam Palladio as Gunnar Scott
 Lennon Stella as Maddie Conrad
 Maisy Stella as Daphne Conrad
 Cameron Scoggins as Zach Welles 
 Kaitlin Doubleday as Jessie Caine

Recurring
 David Alford as Bucky Dawes
 Ed Amatrudo as Glenn Goodman
 Kourtney Hansen as Emily
 Melvin Kearney as Bo
 Andi Rayne and Nora Gill as Cadence Barkley
 Rachel Bilson as Alyssa Greene (season 5B)
 Joseph David-Jones as Clayton Carter
 Rhiannon Giddens as Hallie Jordan
 Christian Coulson as Damien George
 Linds Edwards as Carl Hockney
 Odessa Adlon as Liv
 Ben Taylor as Flynn Burnett
 Jordan Woods-Robinson as Randall St. Claire
 Moses Black as Pastor Lewis
 Jen Richards as Allyson Del Lago
 Murray Bartlett as Jakob Fine
 Joanie Stewart as Sheila Goldfarb
 Bridgit Mendler as Ashley Willerman
 Jeff Nordling as Brad Maitland
 Myles Moore as Jake Maitland
 Katrina Norman as Polly

Guest
Megan Barry as herself
Will Chase as Luke Wheeler
Sylvia Jeffries as Jolene Barnes
Kyle Dean Massey as Kevin Bicks
Carolina Chocolate Drops as Nashville Chocolate Drops
Kathie Lee Gifford as herself
Hoda Kotb as herself 
Carla Gugino as Virginia Wyatt
Judith Hoag as Tandy Hampton
Eric Close as Teddy Conrad
Pam Tillis as herself
J.D. Souther as Watty White
Ruby Amanfu as herself
Blair Gardner as himself
Matthew Bellows as Mike Dolan
Trevor Noah as himself
Harry Connick Jr. as himself
Michael Ray as himself
Jaden Smith as himself
Cassadee Pope as herself
RaeLynn as herself
Lauren Alaina as herself
Kacey Musgraves as herself
Danielle Bradbery as herself

Episodes

U.S. ratings

Nick at Nite Ratings

References

External links
 
 

Season 5
2016 American television seasons
2017 American television seasons
Split television seasons